The Roman Catholic Diocese of Townsville is a suffragan Latin Rite diocese of the Archdiocese of Brisbane, erected in 1930, covering North Queensland, Australia. It was excised from the Diocese of Rockhampton, which had previously covered all of North Queensland.

Bishops

Ordinaries
The following individuals have been elected as Roman Catholic Bishops of Townsville:
{| class="wikitable"
!Order
!Name
!Date enthroned
!Reign ended
!Term of office
!Reason for term end
|-
|align="center"| || Terence Bernard McGuire †||align="center"| 12 February 1930 ||align="center"| 14 June 1938 ||align="right"|  || Appointed Bishop of Goulburn
|-
|align="center"| || Hugh Edward Ryan †|| align="center" | 13 July 1938 ||align="center"| 14 September 1967 ||align="right"|  || Retired and appointed Bishop Emeritus of Townsville
|-
|align="center"| || Leonard Anthony Faulkner † ||align="center"| 14 September 1967 ||align="center"| 2 September 1983 ||align="right"|  || Elevated as Coadjutor Archbishop of Adelaide
|-
|align="center"| || Raymond Conway Benjamin †||align="center"| 14 February 1984 ||align="center"| 18 April 2000 ||align="right"|  || Retired and appointed Bishop Emeritus of Townsville
|-
|align="center"| || Michael Ernest Putney †||align="center"| 24 January 2001 ||align="center"| 28 March 2014 ||align="right"|  || Died in office
|-
|align="center"| || Timothy James Harris ||align="center"| 3 May 2017||incumbent ||
|}

Other priest of this diocese who became bishop
Francis Roberts Rush † , appointed Bishop of Rockhampton in 1960

Parishes
The diocese is divided into four separate deaneries that administer individual parishes:
Townsville deanery with regular liturgical services held in Sacred Heart Cathedral, North Ward (St Joseph's), Cranbrook (Holy Spirit), Deeragun (St Anthony), Gulliver (Holy Family), Kirwan (The Good Shepherd), Magnetic Island (St Joan of Arc), Mundingburra (Blessed Mary MacKillop), Railway Estate (St Francis), South Townsville (St Patrick), West Townsville (St Mary), and Wulguru (St Joseph the Worker)
Northern deanery with regular liturgical services held in Abergowrie (St Theresa), Halifax (St Peter), Ingham (St Patrick), and Palm Island (St Anne)
Southern deanery with regular liturgical services held in Ayr (Sacred Heart), Bowen (St Mary), Burdekin Valley (St Joseph), Cannonvale (St Martin), Collinsville (Our Lady of Lourdes), Giru (St Joseph), Home Hill (St Colman), and Proserpine (St Catherine)
Western deanery with regular liturgical services held in Charters Towers (St Columba), Cloncurry (St Colman), Hughenden (Sacred Heart), Julia Creek (Holy Rosary), McKinlay (Our Lady of the Way), Mount Isa (Good Shepherd), Richmond (St Brigid), and Winton (St Patrick)

Schools
The Townsville Catholic Education Office operates a number of schools in the diocese: 

 North Ward
 St Joseph's School (primary)
 St Patrick's College (secondary)
 Hyde Park
 St Margaret Mary's College (secondary)
 Mundingburra
 St Joseph's Catholic School (primary)
 Currajong
 The Marian School (primary)
 Annandale
 Southern Cross Catholic School (primary)

 Cranbrook
 Holy Spirit School (primary)
 Ignatius Park College (secondary)
 Rasmussen
 Good Shepherd Catholic Community School (primary)
 Kirwan
 Ryan Catholic College (primary & secondary)
 Deeragun
 St Anthony's Catholic College (primary & secondary)
 West End
 Edmund Rice Flexible learning Centre (secondary)
 Palm Island
 St Michael's School (primary)

 Charters Towers
 Columba Catholic College (primary & secondary)
 Ingham District
 Our Lady of Lourdes School, Ingham (primary)
 St Peter's School, Trebonne (primary)
 Canossa School, Trebonne (primary)
 Gilroy Santa Maria College, Ingham (secondary)
 St Teresa's College, Abergowrie (secondary)
 Burdekin River region
 St Francis School, Ayr (primary)
 St Colman's School, Home Hill (primary)
 Burdekin Catholic High School, Ayr (secondary)

 South
 St Mary's School, Bowen (primary)
 St Catherine's School, Proserpine (primary)
 St John Bosco School, Collinsville (primary)
 West
 St Francis School, Hughenden (primary)
 St Patrick's School, Winton (primary)
 St Joseph's School, Cloncurry (primary)
 Mount Isa
 St Joseph's Catholic School (primary)
 St Kieran's School (primary)
 Good Shepherd Catholic College (secondary)

Gallery

See also

Roman Catholicism in Australia

References

External links
Catholic Diocese of Townsville